"Lev lviet!" is a song written by Anders Glenmark and Niklas Strömstedt, and performed by Magnus Carlsson at Melodifestivalen 2006, where it went further from the semifinal in Karlstad to the final inside the Stockholm Globe Arena where it ended up eight. The single was released in 2006.

The song received a Svensktoppen on 14 May 2006, but failed to enter chart.

Charts

References

2006 singles
2006 songs
Melodifestivalen songs of 2006
Swedish-language songs
Number-one singles in Sweden
Songs written by Anders Glenmark
Sony BMG singles
Songs written by Niklas Strömstedt
Magnus Carlsson songs